Alpout-Udzhar is a village in the Ujar Rayon of Azerbaijan.

References 

Populated places in Ujar District